Faith of My Father is the fourth studio album from American singer and songwriter Steffany Gretzinger. It was released on November 5, 2021, through TIM Records. The album features appearances by Melissa Helser and Cassie Campbell. Jason Ingram handled the production of the album.

The album was preceded by the release of "As the Deer" as a single. Faith of My Father debuted at No. 30 on Billboard's Top Christian Albums chart in the United States, and at No. 10 on the Official Charts' Official Christian & Gospel Albums Chart in the United Kingdom.

Background
In October 2021, Steffany Gretzinger announced that she would be releasing Faith of My Father on November 5, 2021. The album is a tribute to Gretzinger's father, who was a pastor, and contains the songs she used to sing as a child at home or during church. The album was recorded at Wooster Church of the Nazarene in Wooster, Ohio, where her Gretzinger's father served as a pastor for almost twenty years.

Release and promotion
"As the Deer" was released as the lead single from the album on October 22, 2021.

Critical reception

Timothy Yap, reviewing for JubileeCast, said in his review of the album: "What a brilliant idea Steffany Gretzinger has had in her hands! Whilst there are many throwback albums to the glory days of the hymnody, there are very tributes paid to glory days of the 90s where "choruses" (yes, that's what worship songs were called) were blooming. In an effort to pay tribute to her dad who had recently gone to heaven, Gretzinger has decided to put her own signature spin on these "choruses.""

Accolades

Commercial performance
In the United States, Faith of My Father debuted at No. 30 on the Billboard Top Christian Albums chart in the United States dated November 20, 2021. In the United Kingdom, Faith of My Father debuted on the OCC's Official Christian & Gospel Albums Chart at No. 10.

Track listing

Personnel
Adapted from AllMusic.
 Cassie Campbell — bass, featured artist
 Kathy Frizzell — piano
 Chris Greely — mixing
 Steffany Gretzinger — primary artist, vocals
 Melissa Helser — featured artist, vocals
 Jason Ingram — producer, programming
 Allison Marin — strings
 Antonio Marin — strings
 Josh Parsons — electric guitar
 Jerricho Scroggins — engineer

Charts

Release history

References

External links
 
 

2021 albums
Steffany Gretzinger albums